Trophy (Israel Defense Forces designation מעיל רוח, lit. "Windbreaker") is a military active protection system (APS) designed to protect vehicles from anti-tank guided missiles (ATGMs), rocket-propelled grenades (RPGs), anti-tank rockets, and high-explosive anti-tank (HEAT) rounds. A small number of explosively formed projectiles destroy incoming threats before they hit the vehicle. Its principal purpose is to supplement the armour of light and heavy armored fighting vehicles. Developed by Rafael Advanced Defense Systems Ltd. of Israel and currently fielding over 1,000 systems to all major Israeli ground combat platforms (Merkava Mark 3 & 4 and Namer APCs), and U.S. Abrams M1A1/2, and tested on the Stryker APCs and Bradley Fighting Vehicles (BFVs). Trophy protects against a wide variety of anti-tank threats, while also maximizing the vehicle's ability to identify enemy location to crews and combat formation, thereby providing greater survivability and maneuverability in all combat theatres.

Design 

Trophy's first production contract was signed in 2007. Safety certification was granted in 2010. First deliveries began immediately afterward. The design includes the Elta EL/M-2133 F/G band fire-control radar with four flat-panel antennas mounted on the vehicle, with a 360-degree field of view. When a projectile is detected, the internal computer calculates an approach vector before the projectile arrives. Once the incoming weapon is classified, the computers calculate the optimal time and angle to fire the counter-measures. The response comes from two rotating launchers installed on the sides of the vehicle which fire a very small number of a MEFPs (Multiple Explosively Formed Penetrators) which form a very tight, precise matrix, aimed at a specific point on the anti-tank projectile's warhead. The system is designed to have a very small kill zone so that it does not endanger personnel near the protected vehicle.

Trophy is a modular system that enables connectivity to other systems, such as soft-kill, C4I systems, remote-controlled weapon stations, etc. The system is designed to work against all types of anti-tank guided missiles, rockets, and high-explosive anti-tank (HEAT) rounds, including handheld weapons such as rocket propelled grenades and recoilless rifles. The system can simultaneously engage several threats arriving from different directions, is effective on stationary or moving platforms, and is effective against both short- and long-range threats. Newer versions of the system include a reloading feature for multiple firings. The Trophy development plan includes an enhanced countermeasures unit to be available in the future to protect against kinetic energy penetrators.

Advantages
The main role of Trophy is defence against missile strikes, more so for lighter armored personnel carriers, which are very vulnerable to rocket attacks. Since 2011, the system has achieved 100% success in all low and high-intensity combat events, in diversified terrain (urban, open and foliage). The system has intercepted a variety of threats, including the 9M133 Kornet ATGM, RPG-29, etc. the U.S Army has reported similar success in tests. “I tried to kill the Abrams tank with ATGM 48 times and failed, despite the fact that some of them were supersonic,” said US Army Col. Glenn Dean. According to Rafael, by 2017, Trophy has accrued over 50,000 operating hours in deployment, bringing the system to a maximum reliability level. To minimize collateral damage and residual penetration, Rafael selected a unique kill mechanism for Trophy, with a surgical effect.

The system uses a miniature EFP which penetrates the threat envelope and disintegrates RPGs at a safe distance from the vehicle. In the ATGM's case, the EFP will affect the chemical energy jet, dramatically decreasing its penetration ability into medium-sized platforms. It has been proven in tests and battle, that such a kill mechanism poses an extremely low risk to dismounts around the vehicle, and thus does not affect usual combined arms tactics, techniques, and procedures. To provide thousands of systems to its customers, Rafael established the first Trophy production line in Israel in 2007, which began delivery in 2010. Another production line was established in the U.S in 2012, which began deliveries in 2015, with a main purpose of providing Trophy systems to the IDF as part of the Foreign Military Funding (FMF) program. Both production lines will be used for the U.S. contract and others.

Trophy is claimed to even be effective at defending against top attack missiles.

Maneuverability enabler
Trophy's radar is responsible for searching, detecting, classifying, locating, and reporting potential threats to the vehicle's onboard computer network and beyond, to the tactical network, creating a Hostile Fire Detection (HFD) ability, which alerts the crew and formation about incoming threats, and instantly provides an exact shooter location on the existing platform display. If Trophy identifies that a threat will miss the platform, it does not activate the countermeasure but provides a shooter's location, enabling rapid engagement by the combat team, thus preventing more attacks. In symmetric warfare situations, Trophy's built-in HFD ability can provide tank crews with the location of enemy tanks, enabling tank crews to respond to incoming attacks.

Disadvantages
The system is currently incapable of defeating kinetic energy tank rounds. Prior to Rafael's declaration of its Medium-sized vehicle active protection Trophy variant (Trophy MV/VPS), there were claims regarding Trophy HV's size and weight.

Trophy MV/VPS

Formerly known as "Trophy Light", Trophy MV/VPS was unveiled by Rafael Advanced Defence Systems at Britain's DSEi 2007. While the standard Trophy was designed for main battle tanks, Trophy MV/VPS is designed for integration with light and medium armoured vehicles, such as the Stryker, Bradley, etc. It is expected to be about 40% less in weight and size of the standard Trophy and cost less while maintaining the same performance and reliability as the Trophy HV variant, this as a result of the use of the same major critical elements - the sensor suite, the mission computer, and the hard-kill mechanism, using the same combat algorithms. It has been reported that Leonardo DRS, Rafael's partner for Trophy in the U.S will provide the modified auto-loader for the system. In the Summer of 2018, Rafael conducted an extensive series of qualification tests for Trophy MV/VPS in Israel, with the presence of over 130 decision makers and technical experts from over 15 countries. The tests were conducted in extreme scenarios, using both rockets and ATGMs. The reported success rate was over 95%.

Trophy LV
In June 2014, Rafael unveiled Trophy LV, a lighter application of the system designed to offer protection to light military vehicles (less than 8 tons) such as jeeps and 4x4s. It weighs , significantly less than other Trophy applications.

Combination with Iron Fist
In December 2014, it was revealed that Rafael, IAI, and Israel Military Industries (IMI) had agreed to jointly develop a next-generation active defense system for vehicles, based on a combination of the Rafael/IAI Trophy and IMI Iron Fist. Rafael will act as the main contractor, system developer, and integrator, and IAI and IMI will be subcontractors. The Defense Ministry had pushed the companies to work together and combine their systems. No progress has been reported since then.

International operators

Current

Germany
In February 2021, the Israeli Ministry of Defense and the German Federal Ministry of Defense signed a government-to-government agreement to supply the Trophy system to the German military, for its fleet of Leopard 2 tanks. Germany’s Federal Office of Bundeswehr Equipment, Information Technology and In-Service Support agreement with the Israeli Ministry of Defense said the covers the supply of systems for a tank company, interceptors, spare parts, and operational and technical training. The systems were to be delivered over the next several years, the ministry added.
Rafael said it had been awarded a contract for an initial batch of Trophy systems and that Krauss-Maffei Wegmann (KMW) had also been awarded a contract. Rafael executive vice-president Ran Gozali, who heads the company’s land and naval division, said the two companies would integrate and install Trophy on the Leopard 2 and future platforms. KMW told Janes Information Services on 23 February that it would install the systems on Leopard 2A6M3 tanks through to 2023. A KMW image of the tank after the upgrade designated it as the Leopard 2A7A1.
Rafael expected Germany to procure more Trophy systems to equip most of its Leopard 2s.
On 2 November 2021, Israel's Ministry of Defense and the German Federal Ministry of Defense have announced successful completion of trials of the Trophy system on Germany's Leopard 2 tanks, conducted on the prior week. The trials included various scenarios to challenge the system, with over 90% of attacks on the tanks intercepted, according to the Israeli Defense Ministry, while the location of the source of fire was also accurately detected. The trials marked the completion of installation of the Trophy systems onto the German tanks.

United States
Trophy has been evaluated with extensive testing on a Stryker vehicle for possible adoption by the US Army, and a Canadian LAV III. The Army tested the Trophy system in 2017, to be fielded within two years as an interim system until the Modular Active Protection System (MAPS) program produces a system. A 193 million dollar contract for Trophy was awarded to Leonardo DRS, Rafael's American partner, in June 2018, to equip a significant number of Abrams M1A1/A2 MBTs with Trophy. In January 2021, Rafael and Leonardo DRS completed urgent deliveries of enough Trophies to the Army to equip all tanks of four armored brigades, some 400 systems.

Trialing

United Kingdom
On 24 June 2021, the UK Ministry of Defence and Rafael have announced that Trophy was selected for detailed assessment and integration into the British Army's Challenger 3 main battle tank. Rafael said in a press release that the selection was the result of a study conducted by the ministry as part of the Challenger upgrade program led by prime contractor Rheinmetall BAE Systems Land, involving detailed integration and system trials of the lighter Trophy MV variant.

Combat history 

Following the series of tests of the Trophy system, the IDF Ground Forces Command declared the Trophy operational in August 2009. It was scheduled to be installed in a full battalion of Israeli Armored Corps tanks by 2010.

On March 1, 2011, stationed near the Gaza border, a Merkava MK IV equipped with the Trophy system foiled a missile attack aimed toward it and became the first operational success of the Trophy active defence system.
On March 20, 2011, a missile was fired at a Merkava MK IV tank equipped with Trophy system inside the Israeli area along the perimeter fence of the Gaza Strip. The system detected the attack, but determined that it did not endanger the tank and did not intercept it; it passed information about the shooting to the crew, who attacked the source of fire.
On August 1, 2012, Trophy successfully intercepted an anti-tank missile launched from the Gaza Strip at a Merkava tank near Kissufim junction.

On July 14, 2014, the Trophy system successfully intercepted a 9M133 Kornet anti-tank missile fired from Gaza at an IDF tank. Since the beginning of the Israeli Operation Protective Edge to July 20, 2014, at least four Israeli tanks of senior commanders were protected by the Trophy system in the Gaza Strip. According to reports from the front, since the beginning of the ground operation, the system successfully intercepted five anti-tank missiles that were aimed at armored IDF vehicles in Gaza. On July 22, 2014, according to a video by a Palestinian group, the Trophy system installed on a Merkava IV tank successfully intercepted an RPG-29 rocket fired at the tank. According to Debkafile, Hamas has tried to stop Israeli tanks with two kinds of advanced guided anti-tank missiles, the Russian Kornet-E, and the 9M113 Konkurs, but Trophy intercepted them successfully. The appearance of near-invulnerable mobile land platforms suggest the current warfare paradigm may need revising.
As of 2016, Trophy is operational on all Merkava Mark-IV tanks of the IDF's 401st Armored Brigade, and with the 7th Armored Brigade 75th Battalion new Merkava IV tanks. In July, the Israeli MOD announced it has completed integrating Trophy on its first brigade company of Namer APCs. In November 2016, it was announced that the IDF will buy hundreds more Trophy systems to install on almost all of its Merkava 4 MBTs and Namer APC/IFVs.

Operation Protective Edge
No tanks were damaged during Operation Protective Edge, with the Trophy Active Protection system performing over a dozen interceptions of anti-tank weapons including Kornet, Metis, and RPG-29. The system, by identifying the source of fire, on occasion also allowed tanks to kill the Hamas anti-tank team.

Giora Katz, head of Rafael's land division, stated that it was a "breakthrough because it is the first time in military history where an active defense system has proven itself in intense fighting." During the war, Trophy validated itself in dozens of events, protecting tanks and crews over three weeks of high-threat maneuvering operations in built-up areas without a single hit to defended platforms and zero false alarms".

Cost
The Trophy "Heavy" system costs around 900,000 to mount on a Merkava Mk. IVM.

Related
 Drozd – The first attempt at making an active protection system by the Soviet Union.
 Arena – An updated and more effective version of Drozd.
 Zaslin – Ukrainian APS for use on BM Oplot tanks.
 Iron Fist – Another Israeli active protection system developed by Israel Military Industries.
 GL5 Active Protection System – A Chinese hard-kill active protection system
 Afganit – A Russian hard-kill active protection for use on the T-14 Armata, T-15 Armata, and Kurganets-25.

References

External links
Trophy APS movie at Fox News
Trophy Demonstration Video

Israeli inventions
Land active protection systems
Military equipment of Israel
Rafael Advanced Defense Systems
Weapons countermeasures
Armoured fighting vehicle equipment
Military equipment introduced in the 2010s